Martha Crawford (born September 30, 1967) is former head of research and innovation on the managing board of Areva, the French state-owned nuclear power conglomerate. One of a very few Americans in the upper ranks of French business, she has a professional background in environmental policy and engineering. A dual national (US and French) based in Paris, she joined Areva in March 2011 after three years as vice president for group research and development at Air Liquide, one of the top 40 private-sector companies in France. L'Oréal announced in March 2014 that as of  October Crawford would join the French cosmetics and beauty group as senior vice president in charge of advanced research and the Scientific Directorate, and member of the Research & Innovation Management Committee.

Early life
Born in Tucson, Arizona, she grew up on a ranch north of Tucson and attended University High School, a public school for the academically gifted and talented. She studied ecology and evolutionary biology at the University of Arizona in Tucson on an Arizona Board of Regents academic scholarship and a fellowship from the E. Blois du Bois Foundation of Phoenix, Arizona.

After graduating in 1989 she worked as an environmental policy intern in the office of Senator Al Gore in Washington, D.C., then as adviser to the head of the Environmental Protection Authority in the republic of the Marshall Islands in Micronesia. She returned to the United States in 1992 to pursue her master's degree and PhD in environmental engineering at Harvard University (with master's coursework and PhD supervision in chemical engineering based at the Massachusetts Institute of Technology). She was awarded the PhD in 1997 and moved to Paris, where she received her Master of Business Administration degree from the Collège des Ingénieurs.

Career

Early career
After working at Suez S.A. in Paris, in 1999 Crawford joined the Organisation for Economic Co-operation and Development. She was an analyst and later principal administrator in the OECD Environment Directorate's program of environmental performance reviews of member and non-member countries, leading multinational teams of experts in evaluating how countries measured up to their own environmental commitments as defined in domestic legislation and international agreements.

Air Liquide
In 2007 Crawford was named vice president of research and development for Air Liquide, where she was responsible for setting strategic direction and leading Air Liquide's R&D activities worldwide. Overseeing the Air Liquide group's eight main R&D centers in Europe, North America and Asia, she administered an innovation budget of over €230 million a year in areas including energy efficiency and industrial process optimization; renewable energy forms such as solar photovoltaics technology, biofuel and hydrogen fuel; and carbon capture and storage.

Areva
At Areva, as a member of the Executive Operations Committee since early 2011, Crawford manages the group's R&D activities (including a €350 million annual budget and ten technical centers in France, Germany and the United States), its intellectual property portfolio, and technological communications and expertise. Areva's R&D areas range from uranium mining and chemical conversion to advanced nuclear reactors and the recycling of spent nuclear fuel. Under Crawford, the R&D portfolio has increased its emphasis on development of alternative energy technologies, including offshore wind power (5 MW turbines), concentrated solar power (Fresnel reflectors) and low-temperature electrolysis coupled with hydrogen fuel cells (Areva's "Green Energy Box").

Board memberships
Crawford serves on the boards of the following organizations:

Areva Med, a subsidiary of Areva producing radioisotopes that target specific types of cancer.

The Areva Foundation, a charitable foundation supporting efforts to fight illiteracy and AIDS.

The Centre National de la Recherche Scientifique (CNRS), France's premier public research agency.

The Commissariat à l'Énergie Atomique et aux Energies Alternatives (CEA).

The Agence nationale de la recherche, which awards funding to public and private scientific research projects.

Other activities
A frequent public speaker in France, Germany and the United States, Crawford contributes in several countries to work on strategy to improve public-private cooperation for R&D and to strengthen education in the sciences and engineering. She is active in international women's networks and, in a country where a 2010 survey of major companies showed that women made up only 37% of the workforce and no women were CEOs, is one of relatively few women executives (and only a handful of Americans) at her level. In 2011, Crawford joined the advisory board of the European Professional Women's Network.

Awards and honors
In 2010, largely because of changes made by Crawford to Air Liquide's global R&D operations, the global management consulting firm A.T. Kearney and the French economic newspaper Les Échos presented Air Liquide with their Best Innovator award, which recognizes companies that integrate strategy, organization, culture and performance into their innovation process. The jury cited the alignment of the Air Liquide innovation strategy with the overall strategy of the group, as well as its structured innovation process, which is shared and open to its partners.

In 2011, Crawford was nominated as Woman of the Year in the Green Business category by the French financial newspaper La Tribune.

Crawford was made a chevalier in the National Order of Merit (France) in May 2012.

Personal life
Martha Crawford was married in 1996 to Pierre Heitzmann, a Frenchman then studying law in the United States, with whom she had three children. The marriage was dissolved in 2012.

A runner since her middle school years, Crawford continues to participate in long-distance running events in France and the United States.

Selected bibliography
In addition to being lead author on 16 country volumes in the OECD Environmental Performance Review series from 1999 to 2008, Crawford has written or co-written, among other publications:

Heitzmann, M. (2011)  "Von natülichen Kohlen-wasserstoffen zu Produkten," Chapter 8 in Energie und Rohstoffe, Spektrum Adademischer Verlag, Heidelberg.

Heitzmann, M. (2010) "Managing Expertise in a World-wide Technology Company," in Commerce in France, American Chamber of Commerce quarterly magazine (March).

Heitzmann, M. (2009) "Air Liquide dévoile son réseau de R&D," in Innovation: L'Economie de la Croissance, 20:14-20 (March).

Rogers, P., Heitzmann, M. et al. (1997) Measuring Environmental Quality in Asia. Harvard University Press, Cambridge, MA.

Crawford, M. and Wilson, R. (1996) "Low-Dose Linearity: The Rule of the Exception?" in Human and Ecological Risk Assessment International 2(2): 305-330.

Crawford, M. (1993) "Sustainable Development in the Pacific Island Nations," in Environmental Science and Technology 27(12): 2286-2290.

Crawford, M. J. (1992) Republic of the Marshall Islands National Environmental Management Strategy, Parts A & B. Developed with RMI National Taskforce on Environmental Management and Sustainable Development, Asian Development Bank.

Crawford, M., Holthus, P. et al. (1992) Vulnerability Assessment to Accelerated Sea Level Rise: Case Study of Majuro Atoll. US National Oceanic and Atmospheric Administration and South Pacific Regional Environment Program.

References

Harvard University alumni
Living people
1967 births
American emigrants to France
American women in business
Businesspeople from Tucson, Arizona